Greta West is a locality in north-east Victoria, Australia.

Ned Kelly, bushranger, lived for a short while near Greta West.

The township was settled in the 1890s, the Post Office opening on 18 April 1892 (closed 1994).

The closest points of reference are Glenrowan and Moyhu.

See also
Greta

References

Towns in Victoria (Australia)
Rural City of Wangaratta